Elachista leucosticta is a moth of the family Elachistidae. It is found in North America, where it has been recorded from California, Iowa and Ontario.

The wingspan is about 6.5 mm. The forewings are dark brown with an irregular white spot on the middle of the dorsum, an oblique white bar at two-thirds of the costa to the middle of the wing, as well as a smaller and triangular tornal spot. The extreme tip of the wing is white. The hindwings are dark brownish grey. Adults have been recorded on wing in June and from August to September.

References

leucosticta
Moths described in 1948
Moths of North America